Ayush Badoni (born 3 December 1999) is an Indian cricketer. He made his Twenty20 debut on 11 January 2021, for Delhi in the 2020–21 Syed Mushtaq Ali Trophy. In February 2022, he was bought by the Lucknow Super Giants in the auction for the 2022 Indian Premier League (IPL) tournament. On 28 March 2022, he played in the first match for the Lucknow Super Giants in the IPL and scored 54 runs.

References

External links
 

1999 births
Living people
Indian cricketers
Delhi cricketers
Lucknow Super Giants cricketers
Place of birth missing (living people)